Böhmenkirch is a municipality in the district of Göppingen in Baden-Württemberg, Germany.

History
Böhmenkirch became a possession of the Electorate of Bavaria in 1806 after it annexed Rechberg and Rothenlöwen, but was in 1810 ceded to the Kingdom of Württemberg. The town was assigned to  until its dissolution in 1938, which resulted in Böhmenkirch being assigned to the district of Göppingen. Böhmenkirch began a period of urban growth after World War II. By the end of the 1960s, there were two new residential areas at the southern edge of the town. An industrial zone was established to the north in the 1970s. Böhmenkirch incorporated the municipalities of Treffelhausen and Schnittlingen in 1973 and Steinenkirch in 1974.

Geography
The municipality (Gemeinde) of Böhmenkirch is found at the eastern edge of the district of Göppingen, along its border with the districts of Ostalbkreis and Heidenheim. All three districts, and by extension Böhmenkirch, are part of Baden-Württemberg, one of the 16 States of the Federal Republic of Germany. Elevation above sea level in the municipal area ranges from a high of  Normalnull (NN) to a low of  NN.

A portion of the Federally-protected  nature reserve is located in Böhmenkirch's municipal area.

Politics
Böhmenkirch has four boroughs (Ortsteile) – Böhmenkirch, Schnittlingen, Steinenkirch, and Treffelhausen – and nine villages: Berg, Hackmesser, Heidhöfe, Lindenhof, Obere Roggenmühle, Ravenstein, Roggensteinhof, Trasenberg, and Ziegelhütte. There are also seven abandoned villages: Boxweiler, Hoebart, Neuhausen, Schönenberg, Siggenweiler, Wintereswanc, Winterreute.

Coat of arms
The municipal coat of arms for Böhmenkirch displays a wooden church, in yellow upon a field of red. An image of a tree had since 1924 been the municipal motif. The red-yellow tincture was taken from the House of Rechberg's arms. The municipal coat of arms was approved by the Federal Ministry of the Interior, and a corresponding flag for Böhmenkirch issued, on 4 September 1958.

Transportation

References

External links

  (in German)

Göppingen (district)